Anna Paluch (born 31 March 1960) is a Polish politician. She was elected to Sejm on 25 September 2005, getting 9547 votes in 14 Nowy Sącz district as a candidate from the Law and Justice list.

See also
Members of Polish Sejm 2005-2007

External links
Anna Paluch - parliamentary page - includes declarations of interest, voting record, and transcripts of speeches.

1960 births
Living people
People from Nowy Targ
Centre Agreement politicians
Law and Justice politicians
Women members of the Sejm of the Republic of Poland
21st-century Polish women politicians
Members of the Polish Sejm 2005–2007
Members of the Polish Sejm 2007–2011
Members of the Polish Sejm 2011–2015
Members of the Polish Sejm 2015–2019
Members of the Polish Sejm 2019–2023